Perlethorpe cum Budby  is a civil parish in the Newark and Sherwood district, within the county of Nottinghamshire, England. The overall area had a population of 183 at the 2011 census. The parish lies in the north west of the county and district. The parish and wider area is at the heart of Sherwood Forest, which is associated with the Robin Hood legend. Thoresby Hall, which is a notable ducal country house and estate is also within the boundaries of the parish.

Geography

Settlements 
The parish consists of two settlements all on the Thoresby Estate:

 Perlethorpe
 Budby

Perlethorpe 

Perlethorpe is based in the eastern portion of the parish, lying just to the left of the A614 Blyth to Ollerton road. It was an estate village for workers at Thoresby Hall clustered around a square layout of roads, with a notable church and estate hall.

Budby 

This is 2 miles south west of Perlethorpe. It is a hamlet lying alongside the A616 Newark-Ollerton-Barlborough Road. It too was an estate village associated to Thoresby Hall, and notable for its pink houses used in the limewash used to paint their exteriors.

Thoresby Hall 

The Grade I hall is now a commercial country hotel, but was once the seat of the Pierrepont & Manvers families until the latter part of the 20th century. The estate through a trust still maintain nearby amenities such as the nearby courtyard, stables, parkland and forestry.

Landscape 
The area of the parish is traditionally part of Sherwood Forest, and it still maintains much forested land, notably the historical Bilhaugh and Birklands forests in the south. Budby North and South Forests take up the west portion of the parish. Thoresby Park with some landscaped areas and farmland take up the central portion, with the southern reaches of Clumber Park in the north.

Predominantly, many of the parish residents are clustered around the villages. Outside of these is a scattering of farms, farmhouses and cottages amongst the wider rural forested setting.

The Robin Hood Way long distance path runs along the western and eastern boundaries of the parish.

Water features 
Two watercourses run through the area:
 River Meden which splits off within the area to the tributary:
 Riven Maun
The Thoresby Lake near the hall was created by damming the Meden.

Land elevation 
The parish is relatively low-lying.

Facilities 
The Thoresby Estate is a family trust who maintain ownership of all the land and facilities within the parish. They manage several locations such as:
 The Thoresby Hall courtyard, which maintains craft shops and a gallery.
 Sherwood Hideway, which is an old World War II army camp converted into a local holiday village, consisting of several lodges hired out for short breaks. There is access to various local activities and amenities.
 A solar farm is based in the Budby North Forest, along with other local environmental schemes and initiatives.

References

External links 
 Thoresby Estate

Civil parishes in Nottinghamshire
Sherwood Forest